The Blackwater River is a  long river in the counties of Dorset and Devon, in the south-west of England. It rises to the north of Marshwood in Dorset, flowing north and west to join the River Axe at a point north of Axminster in Devon. For most of its length it forms the county boundary between Dorset and Devon.

References

Rivers of Devon
Rivers of Dorset